Bitten by the Tarantula and other writing is a 2005 book which includes Julian MacLaren Ross's novella Bitten by the Tarantula collected together with a selection of his short fiction, unfinished longer fiction, essays on cinema, essays on literature and book reviews, and his literary parodies.

2005 books